Kristýna Plíšková was the defending champion but was no longer eligible to compete as a junior.

Ashleigh Barty defeated Irina Khromacheva in the final, 7–5, 7–6(7–3) to win the girls' singles tennis title at the 2011 Wimbledon Championships.

Seeds

  Daria Gavrilova (first round)
  Caroline Garcia (semifinals)
  Irina Khromacheva (final)
  Ons Jabeur (first round)
  Eugenie Bouchard (quarterfinals)
  Montserrat González (quarterfinals)
  Yulia Putintseva (quarterfinals)
  Victoria Bosio (first round)
  Jovana Jakšić (first round)
  Alison Van Uytvanck (second round)
  Daria Salnikova (first round)
  Ashleigh Barty (champion)
  Anett Kontaveit (third round)
  Viktória Maľová (first round)
  Jesika Malečková (second round)
  Victoria Duval (quarterfinals)

Draw

Finals

Top half

Section 1

Section 2

Bottom half

Section 3

Section 4

References

External links

Girls' Singles
Wimbledon Championship by year – Girls' singles